NAVAREAs are the maritime geographic areas in which various governments are responsible for navigation and weather warnings.

NAVAREAs are mentioned in International Maritime Organization Assembly Resolution A.706(17) adopted 6 November 1991.

The International Hydrographic Organization publication S-53 has a document entitled "Worldwide Navigational Warnings Service - Guidance Document" which is related to NAVAREAs.

References

External links
 https://web.archive.org/web/20070927223445/http://www.amsa.gov.au/search_and_rescue/distress_and_safety_communications/pdfs/a706_17.pdf
 https://web.archive.org/web/20070620232731/http://www.iho.shom.fr/COMMITTEES/CPRNW/cprnwintro.htm
 https://web.archive.org/web/20100915053534/http://www.wetterinfobox.com/wib2demo/html/navarea.htm Map of NAVAREAs and schedule for Navtex transmissions

Navigation